Wilmington is a hamlet and census-designated place (CDP) in the town of Wilmington in Essex County, New York, United States. The population of the CDP was 937 at the 2010 census, out of a total town population of 1,253.

Geography
The Wilmington CDP covers a large area in the central part of the town of Wilmington, including the hamlet of Wilmington but extending west to include the hamlet of North Pole, east as far as Hardy Road, and south as far as Fox Farm Road. The West Branch of the Ausable River flows from southwest to northeast through the center of the CDP.

New York State Route 86 runs through the center of the CDP, leading southwest  to Lake Placid and east  to Jay. New York State Route 431 leads west from NY 86 near the center of Wilmington  nearly to the summit of Whiteface Mountain.

Demographics

References

Census-designated places in New York (state)
Census-designated places in Essex County, New York